"Pop" is a song by American boy band *NSYNC. It was released to U.S. radio on May 14, 2001, as the first single from their third studio album, Celebrity. The song was written by Wade Robson and Justin Timberlake and produced by BT. It won four MTV Video Music Awards, for Best Group Video, Best Pop Video, Best Dance Video, and Viewers Choice, as well as a Teen Choice Award for Choice Single.

Background and release

Despite the success of NSYNC's previous studio album No Strings Attached (2000), the band were constantly blasted by critics who had preconceptions of what a "credible group" was, which forced them to be more involved in the production of their next album, Celebrity. While discussing about "Pop" in a 2001 interview with Billboard, Justin Timberlake stated that NSYNC "put everything that is not considered 'pop music' in [the] song".

The group enlisted BT after JC Chasez and Timberlake befriended the musician. Chasez asked BT to appear on NSYNC's next album, but BT was initially hesitant due to his "ambivalence" towards the band. He eventually relented when Timberlake heard BT's song "The Hip Hop Phenomenon", from the UK version of his 1999 album Movement in Still Life, on the request that he "treat [their] vocals so irreverently, it's not even funny". While the song was in production, BT heard Timberlake beatboxing under his breath, and asked to use his vocals. Timberlake initially hesitated, as he did not want it to be featured on any track, but relented as BT created four tracks using broken headphones. After BT created over 1,200 edits of the track using Max Headroom-styled stutter-edits, he showed the song to Chasez and Timberlake, who immediately loved it. Jive Records was initially reluctant to release "Pop" as the first single from Celebrity, as they reasoned that the song is "not radio-friendly" and didn’t not "have a formula".

On May 11, 2001, MTV broadcast a recording of "Pop" via satellite during NSYNC's tour rehearsal for PopOdyssey, which subsequently led to the song's radio release on May 14, 2001. In the United Kingdom and Australia, it was released on July 9, 2001.

Composition and critical reception
"Pop" was written by Wade Robson and Timberlake, and produced by BT using his famous "stutter edit" sound. The song contains genre transitions such as turntablism, hair metal and electro-funk. It also includes a "dance-friendly breakdown", and a Timberlake-performed beat-box, which Jon O'Brien of Billboard compared to the sound of a drum machine. BT used a total of 3,642 vocal edits in the song.

John Hugar of Uproxx opined that the song is "a sort of proto-salvo against in the rockist vs. poptimists argument." Billboard writer Larry Flick described the song as "a crafty, anthemic blend of Cameo-style electro-funk beats, Euro-pop synths, heavy-metal guitars, and Timberlake's now-signature human beat-box riffs."

Commercial performance
"Pop" reached number one on the Canadian Singles Chart. It charted in the top 10 in several countries, including number seven in Norway, number nine on the UK Singles Chart, and number 10 on the Australian ARIA Charts. It peaked on the US Billboard Hot 100 at number 19.

Music video

Background and reception
The music video for "Pop" was directed by American director Wayne Isham and filmed in Sony Pictures Studios from May 13 to 15, 2001. Three sets were built: an apartment shot as the opening scene, a multi-storey club, and a green screen where the band performed the song's dance choreography aided with several computer-generated imagery (CGI) sequences. A 35-foot tall stage was built with a 40-foot ramp, where the dancers were harnessed to the ceiling. Two days before filming, Joey Fatone injured his leg while rehearsing for the PopOdyssey tour in New Orleans, as the area between his knee and calf was trapped between a 300 pound platform underneath the stage, creating a hole in his leg as well as the bone being exposed. Throughout the music video, long-distance camera angles superimposed Fatone's face on Wade Robson's body, as the latter substituted in his place due to the sustained injury. Production costs were reported to be $2.5 million
(equivalent to $ million in ), making it one of the most expensive music videos of all time. The video debuted on MTV's Making the Video on May 28, 2001. Filming lasted for over two straight days, which the band members were not able to sleep and complained about being overworked.

O'Brien described the music video as "Part-infomercial parody, part-club night, part-Warholian expedition" and opined that it is "dizzying".

Synopsis
The music video begins with Sandra McCoy holding a cereal bowl with Alpha-Bits watching the commercial of Justin Timberlake advertising pop to her: "Hey you! Yeah, I'm talking to you, sassy girl. Need a little ahh in your step? Try this on for size: i-i-i-i-i-it's Pop! I-i-i-it tastes great and makes you feel kind of funny, not here, not down there, but all up in this area. And, c-coming J-July 24, 2001, Jumbo-pop."

She drops her cereal bowl and the camera passes through three pieces spelling the word "POP". After the music starts, the video takes place at a colorful disco club with *NSYNC performing on a lighted circle with the word "POP" in a neon sign behind them. While they are singing, Justin is also on a spinning spiral, and JC is in the crowd. Many special effects, including fast-motion, bullet-time, and computer generated warp-transitions, are used. During the song's breakdown, the group perform an extended choreographed sequence, while they are seen in various outfits. At the end of the video, Justin begins to beatbox for thirty seconds, while the other members float in the background.

Live performances
NSYNC performed "Pop" at the 2001 MTV Video Music Awards on September 6, where they were accompanied by Michael Jackson.

Track listings

 US 12-inch single
A1. "Pop" (Deep Dish Cha-Ching remix) – 11:49
B1. "Pop" (Pablo La Rosa's Hard Sync mix) – 6:29
B2. "Pop" (Terminalhead vocal remix edit) – 4:04
B3. "Pop" (Deep Dish Cha-Ching remix edit) – 4:13

 Canadian CD single
 "Pop" – 2:55
 "Pop" (no breakdown) – 2:29

 Australian, New Zealand, and Japanese CD single
 "Pop" (album version) – 3:57
 "Pop" (radio version) – 2:55
 "Pop" (Deep Dish Cha-Ching remix radio edit) – 4:12
 "Pop" (Terminalhead vocal remix) – 5:23

 UK CD single
 "Pop" (radio version) – 2:55
 "Pop" (Pablo La Rosa's Hard Sync mix) – 6:29
 "Pop" (Deep Dish Cha-Ching remix radio edit) – 4:12
 "Pop" (instrumental) – 2:54

 UK cassette single
 "Pop" (radio version) – 2:55
 "Pop" (Pablo La Rosa's Hard Sync mix) – 6:29
 "Pop" (instrumental) – 2:54

 European CD single
 "Pop" (album version) – 3:57
 "Pop" (instrumental) – 3:21

Credits and personnel
Credits adapted from the liner notes of "Pop".

Recording
Recorded at Westlake Recording Studios, Los Angeles, and Metalworks Studios, Toronto

Personnel

 Justin Timberlake songwriter, producer, arranger, beatbox
 BT songwriter, producer, arranger, engineer, programmer, mixing
 Wade J. Robson songwriter, producer, arranger
 Mike Tucker vocal recording engineer
 Carlos Vasquez additional beat programming
 Chris Haggerty digital editing
 Richard Fortus electric guitar, bass
 Kenny Blank additional guitar
 Chaz Harper mastering

Charts

Weekly charts

Year-end charts

Certifications

Release history

References

2001 singles
2001 songs
Canadian Singles Chart number-one singles
Jive Records singles
NSYNC songs
Songs about dancing
Songs about the media
Songs written by Justin Timberlake
UK Independent Singles Chart number-one singles